The Manchurian Candidate is a 1962 American neo-noir psychological political thriller film directed and produced by John Frankenheimer. The screenplay is by George Axelrod, based on the 1959 Richard Condon novel The Manchurian Candidate. The film's leading actors are Frank Sinatra, Laurence Harvey, and Angela Lansbury, with co-stars Janet Leigh, Henry Silva, and James Gregory.

The plot centers on Korean War veteran Raymond Shaw, part of a prominent political family. Shaw is brainwashed by communists after his Army platoon is captured. He returns to civilian life in the United States, where he becomes an unwitting assassin in an international communist conspiracy. The group, which includes representatives of the People’s Republic of China and the Soviet Union, plans to assassinate the presidential nominee of an American political party leading to the overthrow of the U.S. government.

The film was released in the United States on October 24, 1962, at the height of U.S.–Soviet hostility during the Cuban Missile Crisis. It was widely acclaimed by Western critics and was nominated for two Academy Awards: Best Supporting Actress (Angela Lansbury) and Best Editing. It was selected in 1994 for preservation in the United States National Film Registry by the Library of Congress as being "culturally, historically, or aesthetically significant".

Plot
Soviet and Chinese soldiers capture a U.S. Army platoon during the Korean War, taking them to communist China. Three days later, Sergeant Raymond Shaw and Captain Bennett "Ben" Marco return to UN lines. Upon Marco's recommendation, Shaw is awarded the Medal of Honor for saving his soldiers' lives in combat, though two men were killed. Shaw returns to the U.S., where his mother, Eleanor Iselin, exploits his heroism to further the political career of her husband, Senator John Iselin. When asked to describe Shaw, the soldiers in his unit uniformly respond that he is the kindest, bravest, warmest, most wonderful human being they have ever known. In fact, Shaw is a strict, cold, unsympathetic loner hated by his men.

After Marco is promoted to major and assigned to Army Intelligence, he has a recurring nightmare: a hypnotized Shaw blithely murders two soldiers from his platoon before an assembly of communist military leaders to demonstrate their revolutionary brainwashing technique. Marco learns that Allen Melvin, a fellow soldier, has the same nightmare. When Melvin and Marco separately identify identical photos of the two male communist leaders from their dreams, Army Intelligence agrees to investigate.

During captivity, Shaw was programmed as a sleeper agent, who obeys orders to kill and immediately forgets having done so. His heroism is a false memory implanted during the brainwashing. Agents trigger Shaw by suggesting he play solitaire; the queen of diamonds activates him. Meanwhile, Eleanor is masterminding John's political ascent with his baseless claims that communists work at the Defense Department. To spite his mother and stepfather, Shaw takes a job at a newspaper published by Holborn Gaines, Iselin's harshest critic. Communist agents later have Shaw murder Gaines to confirm that his brainwashing still works.

Chunjin, a Korean agent who posed as a guide for Shaw's platoon, arrives at Shaw's apartment asking for work. The unsuspecting Shaw hires him as a valet and cook. Marco recognizes Chunjin when he visits Shaw; he violently attacks him and demands to know what happened during the platoon's captivity. After Marco is arrested for assault, Eugenie "Rosie" Cheyney, an attractive young woman he met on the train, posts his bail.

Shaw rekindles a romance with Jocelyn Jordan, the daughter of liberal Senator Thomas Jordan, the Iselins' chief political foe. Eleanor wants to garner Senator Jordan's support for Iselin's vice-presidential bid. Unswayed, Jordan insists he will oppose the nomination. After Jocelyn inadvertently triggers Shaw's programming by wearing a Queen of Diamonds costume at the Iselins' party, they elope. Furious at Senator Jordan's rebuff, Eleanor—who is Shaw's American handler—sends him to kill Senator Jordan at his home. Shaw also kills Jocelyn when she inadvertently happens upon the murder scene. Having no memory of the killing, Shaw is grief-stricken upon learning they are dead.

After discovering the queen of diamonds card's role in Shaw's conditioning, Marco uses a forced deck to deprogram him, hoping to learn Shaw's next assignment. Eleanor primes Shaw to assassinate their party's presidential nominee during the convention so that Iselin, as the vice-presidential candidate, will become the nominee by default. In the uproar, he will seek emergency powers to establish a strict authoritarian regime. Eleanor tells Shaw that she had requested a programmed assassin, never knowing it would be her own son. When taking power, she vows revenge upon her superiors for choosing him.

Disguised as a priest, Shaw enters Madison Square Garden, taking a sniper's position in a vacant overhead spotlight booth. Marco and his supervisor, Colonel Milt, race to the convention to stop Shaw. At the last moment, Shaw aims away from the presidential nominee and instead kills Senator Iselin and Eleanor. When Marco bursts into the booth, Shaw, wearing the Medal of Honor, says he was the only one who could stop his mother and stepfather, then kills himself. Later that evening with Rosie, Marco mourns Shaw's death.

Cast

Production
Sinatra suggested Lucille Ball for the role of Eleanor Iselin, but Frankenheimer, who had worked with Lansbury in All Fall Down, insisted that Sinatra watch her performance in that film before a final choice was made. Although Lansbury played Raymond Shaw's mother, she was, in fact, only three years older than Laurence Harvey, who played Shaw. An early scene in which Shaw, recently decorated with the Medal of Honor, argues with his parents was filmed in Sinatra's own private plane.

Janet Leigh plays Marco's love interest. In a short biography of Leigh broadcast on Turner Classic Movies, her daughter, actress Jamie Lee Curtis, reveals that Leigh had been served divorce papers on behalf of her father, actor Tony Curtis, the morning that the scene where Marco and her character first meet on a train was filmed.

In the scene where Marco attempts to deprogram Shaw in a hotel room opposite the convention, Sinatra is at times slightly out of focus. It was a first take, and Sinatra failed to be as effective in subsequent retakes, a common factor in his film performances. In the end, Frankenheimer elected to use the out-of-focus take. Critics subsequently praised him for showing Marco from Shaw's distorted point of view.

In the novel, Eleanor Iselin's father had sexually abused her as a child. Before the dramatic climax, she uses her son's brainwashing to have sex with him. Concerned with the reaction to even a reference to a taboo topic like incest in a mainstream film at that time, the filmmakers instead had Eleanor kiss Shaw on the lips to imply her incestuous attraction to him.

Nearly half the film's $2.2 million production budget went to Sinatra's salary for his performance.

Reception

Critical response
Film critic Roger Ebert listed The Manchurian Candidate on his "Great Movies" list, declaring that it is "inventive and frisky, takes enormous chances with the audience, and plays not like a 'classic', but as a work as alive and smart as when it was first released".

On the review aggregator website Rotten Tomatoes, The Manchurian Candidate holds an approval rating of 97% rating based on 60 reviews, with an average rating of 8.70/10. The website's critical consensus reads: "A classic blend of satire and political thriller that was uncomfortably prescient in its own time, The Manchurian Candidate remains distressingly relevant today." On Metacritic, which uses a weighted average, the film has a score of 94 out of 100, based on 20 critics, indicating "universal acclaim".

Awards and honours

In 1994, The Manchurian Candidate was selected for preservation in the United States National Film Registry by the Library of Congress as being "culturally, historically, or aesthetically significant". The film ranked 67th on the "AFI's 100 Years...100 Movies" when that list was first compiled in 1998, but a 2007 revised version excluded it. It was 17th on AFI's "AFI's 100 Years...100 Thrills" lists. In April 2007, Lansbury's character was selected by Time as one of the 25 greatest villains in cinema history.

Releases
According to a false rumor, Sinatra removed the film from distribution after John F. Kennedy's assassination on November 22, 1963. Michael Schlesinger, who was responsible for the film's 1988 reissue by MGM/UA, has helped debunk the rumor. According to him, the film was never removed, and public interest in it was minor before the shootings of Kennedy and Lee Harvey Oswald. The autumn 1962 release had run its course. Box-office successes in the United States in November 1963, immediately before the shootings in Dallas, were comedies, notably It's a Mad, Mad, Mad, Mad World. Movie distributors avoided reviving a thriller with a bleak ending that millions of people had seen barely a year earlier. The aftermath of the Dallas shootings could have lowered demand for the movie, but rentals continued. Newspaper display ads indicate that after the assassination, The Manchurian Candidate was rereleased not nearly as frequently or as widely as other 1962 movies, but was indeed revived and never banned. The movie played at a Brooklyn cinema in January 1964, and that same month in White Plains, New York, and Jersey City, New Jersey. It was televised nationwide on CBS Thursday Night Movie on September 16, 1965.

Sinatra's representatives acquired rights to the film in 1972 after the initial contract with United Artists expired. The film was rebroadcast on nationwide television in April 1974 on NBC Saturday Night at the Movies. After a showing at the New York Film Festival in 1987 increased public interest in the film, the studio reacquired the rights and it became again available for theater and video releases.

See also
 List of American films of 1962
 List of assassinations in fiction
 Conspiracy thriller
 Hypnosis in popular culture
 Spy film

References

External links

 
 
 
 
 
 
 
 The Manchurian Candidate at AMC Filmsite. Background, detailed storyline, and key dialogue excerpts.
 The Manchurian Candidate at McCarthyism and the Movies
The Manchurian Candidate: Dread Center an essay by Howard Hampton at the Criterion Collection
   Ann Hornaday, "The 34 best political movies ever made" The Washington Post Jan. 23, 2020), rank #3
 The Manchurian Candidate essay by Daniel Eagan in America's Film Legacy: The Authoritative Guide to the Landmark Movies in the National Film Registry, Bloomsbury Academic, 2010 , pages 582-584

1962 films
1960s spy films
1960s psychological thriller films
American black-and-white films
American political thriller films
Cold War spy films
1960s English-language films
Fiction about mind control
Films about altered memories
Films about assassinations
Films about elections
Films about fictional presidents of the United States
Films about McCarthyism
Films about the United States Army
Films about veterans
Films based on American novels
Films based on mystery novels
Films critical of communism
Films directed by John Frankenheimer
Films featuring a Best Supporting Actress Golden Globe-winning performance
Films about hypnosis
Films scored by David Amram
Films set in New York City
Films with screenplays by George Axelrod
Korean War films
Matricide in fiction
Murder–suicide in films
United States National Film Registry films
United States presidential nominating conventions in fiction
Uxoricide in fiction
Films about mind control
1960s American films